Sindhi music is popular in Pakistan and some parts of India. There have been several world-famous Sindhi singers who have performed within and without Sindh. This is a list of notable Sindhi singers.

A 

 Abida Parveen
 Allan Fakir
 Arshad Mehmood

B 

 Bhagat Kanwar Ram
Bhagwanti Navani

F 

Fozia Soomro

J 
 Jalal chandio

M
 
 Mai Bhagi
 Manzoor Sakhirani
 Master Chander
 Master Muhammad Ibrahim
 Muhammad Juman
 Muhammad Yousuf

N 
 Noor Bano

R 

 Rubeena Qureshi
 Runa Laila

S 

 Saif Samejo, The Sketches
 Sanam Marvi
 Sarmad Sindhi
 Shazia Khushk
 Suhrab Faqir

Z 

 Zarina Baloch
 Zeb-un-Nissa (singer)

References

Sindhi music
Sindhi
Singers from Sindh